San Francesco del Deserto is an island in the Venetian Lagoon in Véneto, Italy, with a surface of some 4 ha. It is located between Sant'Erasmo and Burano. It houses a Franciscan monastery.

History

The island was frequented since Roman times. In 1220, St. Francis landed here at his return from the Holy Land during the Fifth Crusade, and founded a hermitage here. After his death, the island was given to the Minorites by the Venetian patrician Jacopo Michiel, a relative of the patriarch of Grado, Angelo Barozzi, to found a monastery.

During the Austrian rule of Venice, the island, abandoned due to its unhealthy characteristics, was used as a powder depot. In 1858 it was donated to the diocese of Venice, who allowed the friars to refound a monastery here.

References

External links
Island of San Francesco del Deserto

Geography of Venice
Islands of the Venetian Lagoon